The 2017–18 season is the 77th season in Albacete Balompié ’s history.

Squad

Transfers
Albacete transfers, summer 2017

In

Out

Competitions

Overall

Liga

League table

Matches

Kickoff times are in CET.

Copa del Rey

References

Albacete Balompié seasons
Albacete Balompié